Lăstuni may refer to two villages in Romania:

 Lăstuni, a village in Mihail Kogălniceanu Commune, Tulcea County
 Lăstuni, a village in Dumitrești Commune, Vrancea County